Ciaran Clear (1920 – 2000) was an Irish painter. His work was part of the painting event in the art competition at the 1948 Summer Olympics.

References

1920 births
2000 deaths
20th-century Irish painters
Irish male painters
Olympic competitors in art competitions
Painters from Dublin (city)
20th-century Irish male artists